Eric Smiley (born 28 June 1951) is an Irish former equestrian. He competed at the 1992 Summer Olympics and the 1996 Summer Olympics.

References

External links
 

1951 births
Living people
Irish male equestrians
Olympic equestrians of Ireland
Equestrians at the 1992 Summer Olympics
Equestrians at the 1996 Summer Olympics
Sportspeople from Belfast